The women's high jump event at the 2006 World Junior Championships in Athletics was held in Beijing, China, at Chaoyang Sports Centre on 18 and 20 August.

Medalists

Results

Final
20 August

Qualifications
18 August

Group A

Group B

Participation
According to an unofficial count, 22 athletes from 17 countries participated in the event.

References

High jump
High jump at the World Athletics U20 Championships